Hexamethylenediamine is the organic compound with the formula H2N(CH2)6NH2. The molecule is a diamine, consisting of a hexamethylene hydrocarbon chain terminated with amine functional groups. The colorless solid (yellowish for some commercial samples) has a strong amine odor.  About 1 billion kilograms are produced annually.

Synthesis
Hexamethylenediamine was first reported by Theodor Curtius.  It is produced by the hydrogenation of adiponitrile:
NC(CH2)4CN  +  4 H2   →    H2N(CH2)6NH2
The hydrogenation is conducted on molten adiponitrile diluted with ammonia, typical catalysts being based on cobalt and iron.  The yield is good, but commercially significant side products are generated by virtue of reactivity of partially hydrogenated intermediates.  These other products include 1,2-diaminocyclohexane, hexamethyleneimine, and the triamine bis(hexamethylenetriamine).

An alternative process uses Raney nickel as the catalyst and adiponitrile that is diluted with hexamethylenediamine itself (as the solvent).  This process operates without ammonia and at lower pressure and temperature.

Applications
Hexamethylenediamine is used almost exclusively for the production of polymers, an application that takes advantage of its structure. It is difunctional in terms of the amine groups and tetra functional with respect to the amine hydrogens. The great majority of the diamine is consumed by the production of nylon 66 via condensation with adipic acid. Otherwise hexamethylene diisocyanate (HDI) is generated from this diamine by phosgenation as a monomer feedstock in the production of polyurethane. The diamine also serves as a cross-linking agent in epoxy resins.

Safety
Nonetheless, like other basic amines, it can cause serious burns and severe irritation. Such injuries were observed in the accident at the BASF site in Seal Sands, near Billingham (UK) on 4 January 2007 in which 37 persons were injured, one of them seriously.

See also 
 1,2-Diaminocyclohexane
 2-Methylpentamethylenediamine

References

Monomers
Diamines